Großraum-Verkehr Hannover (GVH; English: Greater Hanover Transport) is a transport association in Germany, operating in the Region Hannover metropolitan area in the state of Lower Saxony. It was founded on March 4, 1970 and is the second oldest transport association in Germany, only surpassed by the Hamburger Verkehrsverbund. The main operators of services in the GVH are üstra, DB Regio and RegioBus. The Hanover Stadtbahn and Hanover S-Bahn services issue and accept tickets of the GVH tariff.

External links 
Official home page

Hanover (region)
Companies based in Hanover
Transport in Hanover
Transport associations in Germany
1970 establishments in West Germany
Transport companies established in 1970
German companies established in 1970